Ventsislav Marinov (born 21 February 1983 in Varna) is a Bulgarian footballer who plays as a defender.

References

1983 births
Living people
Bulgarian footballers
First Professional Football League (Bulgaria) players
PFC Spartak Varna players
FC Chernomorets Balchik players
PFC Svetkavitsa players
Sportspeople from Varna, Bulgaria
Association football central defenders
Association football defenders